Maurice Eugene Willis (born December 4, 1984), who goes by the stage name Jimi Cravity, is an American Christian musician, who primarily plays a style Christian pop, EDM, R&B, and hip hop music. He has released two musical works, both being extended plays, and Maverick (2012) and Heaven (2017) with Sparrow Records and Six Steps Records. The Heaven EP charted on two Billboard magazine charts.

Early life and background
Maurice Eugene Willis was born on December 4, 1984, in Atlanta, Georgia.

Music career
His music recording career started in 2012, with the extended play, Maverick, while it was released on May 20, 2012, independently. He released, Heaven, another extended play, on January 6, 2017, with Sparrow Records and Six Steps Records. This extended play charted on two Billboard magazine charts, while it placed on both the Christian Albums and Heatseekers Albums charts, where it peaked at Nos. 15 and 11, correspondingly.

Personal life
Cravity is married.

Discography
EPs

Singles

References

External links
 

1984 births
Living people
American performers of Christian music
Musicians from Atlanta
Songwriters from Georgia (U.S. state)
Sparrow Records artists
Sixstepsrecords artists